Straight Gut Valley is a valley in Walker County, in the U.S. state of Georgia.

Straight Gut Valley was named from the straight course of the stream in its "gut".

References

Landforms of Walker County, Georgia
Valleys of Georgia (U.S. state)